Montell Brandon Kane Moore (born 23 December 1995) is an English former professional football midfielder. He is a product of the Brentford academy and had a successful spell with Hibernians in 2017. He is presently serving a prison sentence of 11 years and 6 months, after having been found guilty of rape in 2018 at Isleworth Magistrates' Court.

Playing career

Brentford

Youth years (2003–2014) 
Growing up in Chiswick, Moore joined the local Brentford Community Sports Trust at age seven and impressed enough to be offered a place at the club's Centre of Excellence. A broken leg and a year out of football failed to halt his progression through the ranks and he made his debut for the club's youth team during the 2011–12 season, making eight appearances. Moore signed scholarship forms in July 2012. Over the course of his two-year scholarship, he scored 14 goals in 36 appearances for the youth team and finished as top scorer in the 2013–14 season. On 30 June 2014, Moore signed a one-year professional contract to be a part of the Development Squad for the 2014–15 season.

Breakthrough (2014–2016) 
After featuring for the first team during pre-season and scoring in a 5–1 rout of Barnet, Moore was called into the senior squad for the opening game of the 2014–15 Championship season against Charlton Athletic, but remained an unused substitute. He made his professional debut in the following match, starting in a League Cup first round tie with Dagenham & Redbridge. With the score at 4–4, Moore scored his first senior goal seven minutes into extra time and Brentford won the match on penalties after an incredible 6–6 draw. He also set up two goals for Stuart Dallas. Moore signed a new three-year contract on 15 August, but lost his place in the squad due to the arrival of Betinho on loan and the resurgence of Toumani Diagouraga. He continued to appear regularly for the Development Squad and spent the second half of the 2014–15 season out on loan.

Moore failed to feature at all for the first team during the first six months of the 2015–16 season and his contract was cancelled by mutual consent on 1 February 2016. He made one first team appearance and scored 9 goals in 31 matches for the Development Squad during 18 months as a professional at Griffin Park.

Burnham (loan) 
Moore and Brentford Development Squad teammate George Pilbeam joined Southern League Premier Division strugglers Burnham on loan on 11 February 2014. In a spell affected by the weather, Moore made just one appearance for the Blues, as a late substitute in a 4–2 defeat to St Neots Town on 15 February.

Midtjylland (loan) 
On 19 January 2015, Moore joined Danish Superliga leaders Midtjylland on loan until May 2015. He made 8 U19 and two reserve team appearances and helped the U19 team to the U19 Ligaen title. He returned to Griffin Park after his loan expired.

Charlton Athletic 
On 15 February 2016, Moore joined Championship side Charlton Athletic until the end of the 2015–16 season after a successful trial with the club's Development Squad. He made one appearance for the club's U23 team in a Kent Senior Cup match.

Hibernians 
In mid-January 2017, Moore moved to Malta to join Maltese Premier League club Hibernians. He made 11 appearances and won the first senior silverware of his career when Hibernians claimed the league title with one match to spare. He departed the club after the season.

Enfield Town 
After receiving international clearance, Moore returned to England to join Isthmian League Premier Division club Enfield Town on 15 September 2017. He made his debut the following day as a late substitute for Mickey Parcell in a 0–0 FA Cup second qualifying round draw with Hanwell Town. He scored his first goal for the club in the following match, with the third goal in a 5–0 rout of Hanwell Town in the replay. Moore was released in November, after making 12 appearances and scoring two goals for the club.

Honours 
Hibernians

 Maltese Premier League: 2016–17

Career statistics

References

External links 
 
 
 

1995 births
Living people
English footballers
Footballers from Brentford
Black British sportspeople
Brentford F.C. players
Burnham F.C. players
Association football midfielders
Southern Football League players
FC Midtjylland players
English expatriate footballers
English expatriate sportspeople in Denmark
Expatriate men's footballers in Denmark
Charlton Athletic F.C. players
Maltese Premier League players
English expatriate sportspeople in Malta
Expatriate footballers in Malta
Hibernians F.C. players
Enfield Town F.C. players
Isthmian League players
English people convicted of rape